Aracamby is a genus of crickets in the family Phalangopsidae, native to the Atlantic coastal forest of Brazil. Unusually for crickets, they appear to not provide paternal investments to their mates.

Species
Currently accepted species include:

Aracamby balneatorius de Mello, 1992
Aracamby mucuriensis de Mello, 1992
Aracamby picinguabensis de Mello, 1992

References

Crickets
Orthoptera genera